Walnut Park may refer to:

 Walnut Park, California, a Neighberhood  in Huntington park, California.
 Walnut Park Elementary School, Smithers, British Columbia, Canada
 Walnut Street Park, a municipal park in Hillsboro, Oregon, U.S.

See also
 Walnut Park Historic District
 Walnut Park East, St. Louis, Missouri
 Walnut Park West, St. Louis, Missouri